Peker Açıkalın (born March 1, 1963) is a Turkish actor who usually appears in comedic roles.

Biography 
Peker Açıkalın grew up as one of three children in İstanbul. Despite his parents‘ pressure for him to join the family‘s manufacturing business, he pursued his dream to become an actor. Açıkalın made his first television appearance in Kim Bunlar? on TRT 1. He gained widespread fame for his roles in the comedy series Çiçek Taksi and as Gaffur in Avrupa Yakası.

Filmography

Television 
 1989: Kim Bunlar
 1991: İşte Onlar
 1992: Deli Dolu
 1994: Gülşen Abi - Alper
 1995/1998/2000: Çiçek Taksi - Ömer Şen
 2002: Ev Hali - Oral
 2002–2005: Ekmek Teknesi - Cengiz
 2006: Avrupa Yakası - Gaffur Aksoy
 2007: Yalan Dünya - Nibun 
 2008: Mert ile Gert - Cenabettin Seçkin
 2010: Yahşi Cazibe - Peker Pekmez
 2012: Türk'ün Uzayla İmtihanı - Ziya
 2018: Ege'nin Hamsisi - Horoz Ağa
 2023: Başım Belada

Film 
 1999: Kara Kentin Çocukları - Özgür
 2002: Kolay Para - Ender
 2003: Hababam Sınıfı Merhaba - Psiko
 2004: Hababam Sınıfı Askerde - Psiko
 2005: O Şimdi Mahkum - Erketeci
 2005: Maskeli Beşler İntikam Peşinde - Bahattin
 2005: Hababam Sınıfı Üç Buçuk - Psiko
 2006: Maskeli Beşler: Irak - Bahattin
 2006: Amerikalılar Karadeniz'de 2 - Ercüment
 2008: Maskeli Beşler: Kıbrıs - Bahattin
 2008: Destere - Hayrettin
 2009: Türkler Çıldırmış Olmalı - Kadir
 2014: Gülcemal - Gülcemal
 2014: Polis Akademisi Alaturka - Kinyas
 2017: Vezir Parmağı - Nazik
 2018: Baba 1.5 - Seyfi
 2018: Karımı Gördünüz Mü? - Hakkı Geçer
 TBD: Türkler Çıldırmış Olmalı 2'' - Kadir

References

External links 

Turkish Peker Açıkalın's Biography

1963 births
Living people
Turkish comedians
Turkish male film actors
Turkish male television actors
Turkish male stage actors
Turkish Muslims
Converts to Islam from atheism or agnosticism